Verkligen (Swedish for Really) is the second studio album by Swedish alternative rock band Kent. It was released on 15 March 1996, exactly one year after their self-titled debut album.

Track listing

Personnel
Joakim Berg – lyrics, music
Martin Sköld – music
Nille Perned – producer, mixing
Zmago Smon – mixing
Peter Dahl - mastering

Charts

References 

1996 albums
Kent (band) albums